Nylanderia pubens is a species of ant of the genus Nylanderia, commonly called the Caribbean crazy ant. It was originally described as Paratrechina pubens from Saint Vincent, Lesser Antilles. This species was moved from Paratrechina to the genus Nylanderia in 2010.

These ants are about one-eighth inch long and are covered with reddish-brown hairs. The colonies have multiple queens. An infestation of this species, or a related species named
Nylanderia fulva, is ongoing in and around Houston, Texas.

Description
Nyladeria pubens is included in a group called "crazy ants" due to the quick and erratic movements they make. Its antennae have 12 segments, and lack clubs. The antennal scape is nearly twice as large as the head. Its bite is not known to sting.

See also
Similar ants
 Nylanderia fulva
 Prenolepis impairs

References

External links

Caribbean Crazy Ant Fact Sheet from the National Pest Management Association with information on habits, habitat and prevention
  Caribbean crazy ant  on the UF / IFAS Featured Creatures Web site

Formicinae
Insects described in 1893